Yishan may refer to:

Yishan (official) (奕山; ? – 1878), an official during the Qing dynasty
Yishan Yining (一山 一寧; 1247–1317), a Zen master

Locations in China 

Yishan, Guanyun County (伊山镇), town in Guanyun County, Jiangsu
Yishan, Linqu County (沂山镇), town in Linqu County, Shandong
Yishan, Zoucheng (峄山镇), town in Zoucheng, Shandong
Yishan, Cangnan County (宜山镇), town in Cangnan County, Zhejiang
Yishan County (宜山县), currently Yizhou District, Hechi, Guangxi